Luis Barros Borgoño (March 26, 1858 – July 26, 1943) was a Chilean politician who served as Vice President of Chile in 1925.

Born in Santiago, he was the son of Manuel Barros Arana and Eugenia Borgoño Vergara. He graduated as a lawyer in 1880, held a position in the Supreme Court in 1884, was Minister of War and Navy on three occasions (1890, 1892 and 1895–96), was Minister of Foreign Affairs twice (1894 and 1918) and Finance Minister in 1901.

As the conservative candidate in the Chilean presidential election of 1920, he faced the liberal Arturo Alessandri and was defeated by a very slim margin. When Alessandri resigned again on October 1, 1925 Barros occupied the Vice-Presidency until December 23 of that same year, when Emiliano Figueroa took possession.

Barros was also an author who focused on history. He wrote several volumes including The Muzzi Mission, a Life of Admiral Patricio Lynch and Mission in the Plata, in which he defended his uncle, Diego Barros and his participation in the negotiations with Argentina over the Patagonia.

References 

1858 births
1943 deaths
Candidates for President of Chile
Chilean Ministers of Defense
Chilean Ministers of the Interior
Chilean people of Galician descent
Foreign ministers of Chile
Mayors of Las Condes
Members of the Chilean Academy of Language
People from Santiago
University of Chile alumni
Vice presidents of Chile